Thousands of police officers in Britain are alleged to have died during the course of their duties, but this article includes only those who were killed as a direct result of a crime or while attempting to respond, prevent, stop or solve a specific criminal act. The list is currently incomplete and misses many of those who died in more regular circumstances such as traffic collisions, as well as the many killed by air raids during the Second World War. The list also omits the more than 300 officers of the former Royal Ulster Constabulary (RUC).

List

Key to rank abbreviations: A/x = Acting • ACC = Assistant Chief Constable • CEO = Civilian Explosives Officer • Cmdr = Commander • DC = Detective Constable • DI = Detective Inspector • DS = Detective Sergeant • Insp = Inspector • PC = Police Constable • Sgt = Sergeant • SPC = Special Police Constable • Stn Sgt = Station Sergeant • Supt = Superintendent • WPC = Woman Police Constable • WRC = War Reserve Constable.

See also

List of killings by law enforcement officers in the United Kingdom
List of American police officers killed in the line of duty
List of Irish police officers killed in the line of duty
Police Roll of Honour Trust
National Police Memorial (London)

Notes

References

External links
 Police Roll of Honour Trust
United Kingdom Police Force Rolls of Honour
National Police Memorial at the National Memorial Arboretum

killed in the line of duty
 
 
Police
Lists of police officers killed in the line of duty
Police officers killed in the line of duty